is a song recorded by Japanese duo Yoasobi. It was released as a standalone single on February 15, 2023, through Sony Music Entertainment Japan. Written by Ayase, the song is a theme for 2023 Universal Studios Japan's campaign Unibaru, based on Nagi's novel Lens Goshi no Kirameki o. Its accompanying music video, showing an animated girl dancing in the theme park, premiered on March 11. Commercially, "Adventure" peaked at number 50 on the Oricon Combined Singles and number 30 on the Billboard Japan Hot 100.

Background and composition

On October 19, 2022, Yoasobi announced a collaboration with Universal Studios Japan to write and sing a theme for the student support campaign called Unibaru in 2023, based on the novel that won the contest held by the campaign, under the theme "unforgettable memories in school age at the [USJ] park". Nagi's  won the contest and received "Yoasobi Award". The theme park released a Unibaru advertisement on January 26, 2023, featuring Yoasobi's new song titled "Adventure". Since February 1, the song was played at Hollywood Dream – The Ride venue in the theme park.

The full-length version of the song was aired for the first time on the radio show Rock Kids 802 on February 9. Three days later, Yoasobi revealed the cover artwork and the teaser video for "Adventure", announcing to be available for digital music and streaming platforms on February 15. Created by Kouhei Kadowaki, the cover artwork features an illustration of confetti in front of Universal Studios Japan's gate. The teaser video shows Ikura's voice reading passages from the based novel with the blurred background of the theme park. "Adventure" is described as "a bright and refreshing spring-like song packed with fun memories at the [USJ] park." The song was composed in the key of A major, 128 beats per minute with a running time of three minutes and 19 seconds.

Music video

An accompanying music video for "Adventure", directed by Jun Tamukai, premiered on March 11, 2023, at 10:00 AM JST. It shows a fusion of live-action and animation, depicting "somewhere between reality and fantasy." The story of the music video is creative director Rei Hanada's idea after her first listening to the song, and imaging a scene of "a girl walking around Universal Studios Japan and dancing with her heart pumping."

The video begins with an animation of a girl walking and starting to dance in the "low degree of freedom" background with "flat horizontal scrolling like a retro game and limited colors." When the girl runs through the gate, the background is changed to inside Universal Studios Japan at night and she continuously dances, including at the square and the restaurant. The video ended up with an animated girl returning to reality and meeting her friends who "could not meet easily due to the COVID-19 pandemic" in front of the theme park.

Live performances

Universal Studios Japan held a special concert, called Unibaru! Live 2023, at Universal Studios Japan, Osaka, for four days on March 11–12 and 25–26; the lineup included Yoasobi, Sakurazaka46, Little Glee Monster, and NiziU. The duo performed on the first day and gave the debut performance of "Adventure" as the last song of the setlist, featuring Snoopy, Hello Kitty, and Sesame Street mascots.

Charts

Release history

References

External links
 

2023 singles
2023 songs
Japanese-language songs
Sony Music Entertainment Japan singles
Yoasobi songs